Guindy taluk is a taluk of the city district of Chennai in the Indian state of Tamil Nadu. It was formed in December 2013 from parts of the erstwhile Mambalam-Guindy taluk and the Mylapore-Triplicane taluk. It comprises the neighbourhoods of Adyar, Alandur, T. Nagar, Ekkaduthangal, Guindy and Kotturpuram.

References

General
 Taluks of Chennai district

Specific

Taluks of Chennai district